Bangladesh University of Textiles, commonly referred to as BUTEX, is a public university in Bangladesh, situated in Dhaka North City Corporation (DNCC). It is a public research higher-education institution located in the urban setting of the large metropolitans of Dhaka. It is the first and only public university to teach textile engineering in Bangladesh. The institution established education which keeps entrepreneurial and industrialisation.

It has eight textile engineering affiliated colleges, each of which is textile based institutes of technology. The colleges are centrally regulated by the university while funding is provisioned under a bilateral Memorandum of understanding signed between Ministry of Education, Bangladesh and Department of Textiles, Bangladesh.

The university itself offers academic and professional degrees in various fields of textile technology, fashion designing, advanced business and marketing strategies and in several other disciplines on both undergraduate and postgraduate levels.  it offers graduate program in 10 different specialized areas under its five distinct faculties.

History 

The institution was originally established in 1921 as a weaving school at Narinda, Dhaka, during the British colonial rule, to provide specialized technical education in the fields of textile by offering artisan-level courses. It used to go by the name "British Weaving School". A while later, it took the name "East Bengal Textile Institute" only to offer diploma courses in textile manufacturing process. In 1957, The institute was transferred to its present campus at Tejgaon Industrial Area and set it's foudation stone by Bangabandhu Sheikh Mujibur Rahman. In 1960, it started academic activities renamed as "East Pakistan Textile Institute".

In the post-liberation era of Bangladesh, in 1971, the institute was renamed as "Bangladesh Textile Institute". Afterward, in 1978, the institute launched a four-year period bachelor's degree program in textile technology in affiliation with University of Dhaka and re-branded itself as "College of Textile Engineering and Technology". Initially, intake was only 60 per year and more than 4,800 textile engineers and technologists have graduated from this institution since the introduction of bachelor's degree course.

The envolved College of Textile Engineering and Technology was run under the administrative control of the Bangladesh education ministry through Directorate of Technical Education which offered Bachelor of Science in textile technology and in textile management courses as a constituent college of the University of Dhaka. The Government of Bangladesh took initiatives to upgrade the College of Textile Engineering and Technology into a full-fledged university. After receiving a formal consent from the President of Bangladesh to fulfill that purpose, the "Bangladesh Textile University Act, 2010" (Act no. 49, 2010) was passed by the Bangladesh national assembly on 5 October 2010. The act was made effective from 22 December 2010 as per SRO No. 395-law/2010 date 20 December 2010 of the Ministry of Education, Bangladesh. The Prime Minister of Bangladesh, Sheikh Hasina, officially inaugurated the revamped institution with its present naming scheme BUTEX on 15 March in next year.

List Of Vice-Chancellors 

 Prof. Dr. Nitai Chandra Sutradhar (2010 – 2015)
 Prof. Md. Masud Ahmed (2015 – 2019)
 Prof. Engr. Md. Abul Kashem (2019 – 2023)
 Prof. Dr. Shah Alimuzzaman (2023 - Present)

Academic Section 

 Faculty of Textile Engineering :
 Department of Fabric Engineering
 Department of Yarn Engineering
 Faculty of Fashion Design & Apparel Engineering :
 Department of Apparel Engineering
 Department of Textile Fashion & Design
 Faculty of Textile Chemical Engineering :
 Department of Wet Process Engineering 
 Department of Dyes & Chemical Engineering
 Department of Environmental Science & Engineering
 Department of Materials Science & Engineering
 Faculty of Textile Management & Business Studies :
 Department of Textile Engineering Management
 Department of Industrial & Production Engineering
 Department of Humanities & Social Sciences
 Faculty of Science & Engineering :
 Department of Chemistry
 Department of Mathematics & Statistics
 Department of Machinery Design & Maintenance
 Department of Physics

Enrollment

Undergraduate 
After completion of HSC (Higher Secondary School Certificate) education, a student can submit his/her application for undergraduate admission if they fulfill the minimum requirements. The students with the best grades in Mathematics, Physics, Chemistry & English on their Higher Secondary School Certificate (HSC) examination are allowed to take the admission test.

After the competitive admission test, only about 600 students get selected on the basis of merit. A candidate is eligible to apply for admission into Level-1, Term-1 of undergraduate studies.

Total enrollment per year = 600.

Institutes

Bangladesh Handloom Education and Training Institute 

Bangladesh Handloom Education and Training Institute, is a technical training institute controlled by Bangladesh Handloom Board and maintained by Ministry of Textiles and Jute, under the academic supervision of BUTEX.

Campus life

Student activities 

 

 
Several student run organizations or clubs in the institution allow its members and participants to engage in co-curricular and extra-curricular activities. The university administration permits their formation, provides them with necessary funding and associates a selected portion of them with faculty guidance. Some of the clubs are branches of large organizations expanding their countrywide and sometimes, global network, among youths. Names of each of the student organizations and clubs are listed following an alphabetic order below:
 ARTEX – Born after an initiative taken by the students to beautify their campus, this club focuses on practicing several form of arts and occasionally hosts events where students participate in doing campus-wide graffiti alongside various other arts based competitions.
 Badhon – The BUTEX unit of this Bangladeshi voluntary organization runs its operation to encourage students in donating blood and makes arrangements in times of critical emergency necessity. They also hosts annual events where students coming from disadvantaged families get a chance to test their blood and know their groups for free.
 Butex Shahitto Shongshod – A place for students to share and practice their literary skills. Despite not having any publication scope of their own, they hold occasional literary events internally.
  BUTEX Business Club – Created with a business theme, members of this club host business-case solving events, and arrange seminars involving industry leaders and innovators from the corporate world. The club also houses academic decathlons and provides ways for students to participate in internationally recognized competitions by inviting and introducing the organizers to the campus. It is among the few clubs on campus to receive a faculty member appointed in their governing body as their advisor of operations.
 BUTEX Debating Club – Playing its role of providing a platform to its members, this club, under its flagship name Bunon, often gets to represent the institution nationally and internationally in various fields of artistic speech giving and debates..
 BUTEXITS – Students in schools have been developing apps during their study years independently.
 BUTEX Career Club – This club organizes events to aid young learners to clarify their future career path. They arrange workshops and job fairs.
 Chemical Club – Created by the faculty of Textile Chemicals Engineering, this club works with students who show interest in the field of chemistry. They host workshops and is guided by a faculty in their operations.
 Ekattor – The cultural club of BUTEX, it includes a cultural unit, a theater unit, and a photographic society unit. It started its journey on 26 March 2011, in an honor to a freedom fighter of the Bangladesh Liberation War.
 BUTEX Environmental Club – A socially active club, which works to raise consciousness about the surrounding, and to lessen all forms of pollution, with trying to find out effective solutions for better industrial waste management.
 Fashionnovation – A club centered around creative ideas of fashion. They arrange design competitions and launch assistive courses online.
 Film Society – This club engages in making indie films and supports film-making talents inside the campus by promoting their efforts. Often, they produce short-films and arrange campus-wide watch parties.
 Journalist Society – This club is focused on campus related issues and news from the global textile community.
 BUTEX Science Club – A student initiative working for the enrichment of scientific knowledge and enhancement of research in the undergraduate level. It is also among the clubs that receives an operations advisor from the university faculty. It organizes events and participates in inter-university Olympiads and competitions on various occasions.
 BUTEX Spinner's Club – This club is formed by students from the Department of Yarn Engineering and primarily focuses on increasing its collaborative network with the industry. It occasionally arranges recreational events and hosts annual carnivals which extend beyond the campus.

Student residences 

There are 4 halls to provide public residence for the regular students. Administrative head in charge of a dormitory is its Provost, who is elected from among the institution faculty, and is granted the duty for a two-year time period.
 

They are listed below:

Each of these facilities are named after eminent historical figures of Bangladesh, only except being the Sheikh Hasina Hall.

Sports facilities 

The institution has a centrally located playground inside of the campus for its students and the faculty. There are two other separate playgrounds, one of which is located at the premises of the Shahid Aziz Hall (indoor sports), while the other is at the G.M.A.G. Osmani Hall — being the largest playground of them all.

Notable alumni 

 Mozaffar Hossain; was elected member of parliament (M.P.) for the Jamalpur-5 constituency in 2018, Bangladesh Government.

 Gen. Aziz Ahmed; is a former four Star General and Chief of Army Staff (CAS) of the Bangladesh Army.

See also 
 Textile Schools In Bangladesh

References

External links 
 Professor Md. Abul Kashem BUTEX VC
 
 Textile Based Magazine
 PM Opens First Textile University
 BUTEX Shahitto Shongshod Website

 
Universities and colleges in Dhaka
Technological institutes of Bangladesh
Engineering universities and colleges in Bangladesh
Engineering universities of Bangladesh
Public engineering universities of Bangladesh
Public universities of Bangladesh
Textile schools in Bangladesh
Textile industry of Bangladesh